Sahib-e-Asra (born 19 July 1997) is an athlete from Pakistan. She specialises in the sprint events: 100m, 200m and 400m.

Background 
Asra's father, Qari Alam Khan who is the imam of a local mosque in Faisalabad is supportive of his daughter's endeavours.

Career 
Asra competed at the junior level, both nationally and internationally.

National 
In national competitions, she represents WAPDA. At the 2018 National Athletics Championships, she won gold in the 100m in a time of 11.60.

International 

External links 

 Twitter (official)

References 

Living people
1997 births
Pakistani female sprinters